Henry Fleming (1663–1713) was an English politician.

He was Member of Parliament (MP) for St Germans from 1690 to 1698 and from 1700 to 1708.

References

1663 births
1713 deaths
Members of the Parliament of England (pre-1707) for St Germans
Members of the Parliament of Great Britain for St Germans
Politicians from Cornwall
English MPs 1690–1695
English MPs 1695–1698
English MPs 1698–1700
English MPs 1701
English MPs 1701–1702
English MPs 1702–1705
English MPs 1705–1707
British MPs 1707–1708